International Sheep Dog Society (ISDS) was formed with the intention of increasing interest in securing the better management of livestock by improving the shepherd's dog to enable further business and community services of the Society. This remains the intention today. Without a good working dog, the shepherd's work on both the hills and the lowlands would be impossible.  It seeks to achieve this by, amongst other things, managing the registration of dogs in its stud book.

The International Sheep Dog Society was founded in 1906, with the purpose of "improving the shepherd's dog".
In the early years, the ISDS (as it is generally known) was centered in the Scottish Borders, but over the years it has grown to be truly international.

An annual "International" sheepdog trial, has been held every year since 1906, with breaks only for the two World Wars and the 2001 Foot and Mouth outbreak. In 1922, National trials were set up in England, Scotland and Wales to find a national champion for each country and act as qualifying trials for the International trial. Ireland (comprising North, South and the Isle of Man) joined in 1961 to complete the set of four home nations.

However, further expansion was to come. The International trial was international in that it was a competition "between nations", but because of the rules governing quarantine for dogs entering or reentering the UK, an all world competition wasn't possible, even though sheepdog trials, many of them using dogs bred in the UK, were taking place in many countries using ISDS rules and judged by ISDS judges, including the Continental (European) trial, which is held annually with ISDS encouragement and support.

The first World Trial took place in Bala, North Wales, in 2002, and is now held every three years. It is a wonderful opportunity for people from all over the world with a similar interest to meet and see the best sheepdog handlers the world has to offer, always in a breathtaking setting.

But the ISDS is not only about sheepdog trialling. The ISDS Stud Book was set up in the late 1940s and remains in invaluable list of working sheepdogs and their progeny. Knowledge of how a dog is bred is essential for anybody wanting a dogs from a working strain and looking for certain characteristics. The ISDS has also sought to work with the veterinary profession to eradicate genetic defects in the Border Collie such as CEA (Collie Eye Anomaly) and PRA (Progressive Retinal Atrophy) through careful breeding and through the use of DNA tests. There are over 300,000 entries in the Stud Book, and thousands of new entries are added every year, either on the basis of parentage or if a dog has proved itself to be a good working example ("Registered on Merit").

The ISDS also promotes the training of young sheepdog handlers through a number of practical methods, some farm based, some competitive.

The ISDS has several thousand members all over the world, currently enjoying the membership rights, which include the popular bimonthly magazine International Sheepdog News. Details can be found on the ISDS website at www.isds.org.uk to which there is a link below.

The structure of the International Sheep Dog Society is thus:

Members from England, Ireland, Scotland and Wales all elect up to ten Directors annually, who meet an annual meeting.

From those Directors, members of the ISDS Council are elected annually, and it is the Council which is the ISDS governing body, the Council members acting as the Trustees of the ISDS, which is a registered charity.

Each of the four home nations has elected Junior and Senior Vice Presidents and a National President. The Chairman of the ISDS is also elected, and as well as chairing meetings, each Chairman has been at the forefront of advancing the Society and in determining policy.

The day-to-day administration of the ISDS is in the hands of the Executive Officer (until 2001 going under the title of ISDS Secretary) who supports the community with independent, confidential and impartial advice services for members, based at the ISDS office in Bedford, where the administrative staff carry out the day to day tasks involved in what over the last 103 years has become a sizeable organisation.

See also
 Herding dogs
 Sheepdog trials
 Working dogs
 SASDA

External links
 Official site

Dog organizations